Thomas Sharp McKechnie (9 February 1940 – 6 April 2009) was a Scottish footballer who played as a forward, best known for his time with Luton Town. He also played in the Football League for Boscombe and Bournemouth Athletic and Colchester United.

Playing career

Born in Milngavie, McKechnie started out with Bridgeton Waverley before joining Rangers, but never appeared in the Scottish League. He left for Kirkintilloch Rob Roy before moving south of the border to Luton Town in 1961. He spent five years in Bedfordshire before moving to Boscombe and Bournemouth Athletic, where he spent a year. He then spent a season at Colchester United before moving into non-League football with Bury Town.

References

1940 births
2009 deaths
People from Milngavie
Sportspeople from East Dunbartonshire
Scottish footballers
Association football forwards
Bridgeton Waverley F.C. players
Rangers F.C. players
Kirkintilloch Rob Roy F.C. players
Luton Town F.C. players
AFC Bournemouth players
Colchester United F.C. players
Bury Town F.C. players
English Football League players